"Fire and Ice" is a popular poem by Robert Frost that discusses the end of the world, likening the elemental force of fire with the emotion of desire, and ice with hate. Published in December 1920 in Harper's Magazine and in 1923 in his Pulitzer Prize-winning book New Hampshire, "Fire and Ice" is one of Frost's best-known and most anthologized poems.

Inspiration
According to one of Frost's biographers, "Fire and Ice" was inspired by a passage in Canto 32 of Dante's Inferno, in which the worst offenders of hell (the traitors) are submerged up to their necks in ice while in a fiery hell: "a lake so bound with ice, / It did not look like water, but like a glass...right clear / I saw, where sinners are preserved in ice."

In an anecdote he recounted in 1960 in a "Science and the Arts" presentation, the prominent astronomer Harlow Shapley claims to have inspired "Fire and Ice". Shapley describes an encounter he had with Frost a year before the poem was published in which Frost, noting that Shapley was the astronomer of his day, asked him how the world will end. Shapley responded that either the sun will explode and incinerate the Earth, or the Earth will somehow escape this fate only to end up slowly freezing in deep space. Shapley was surprised at seeing "Fire and Ice" in print a year later, and referred to it as an example of how science can influence the creation of art, or clarify its meaning.

Style and structure
The poem is written in a single nine-line stanza, which greatly narrows in the last two lines. The poem's meter is an irregular mix of iambic tetrameter and dimeter, and the rhyme scheme (which is ABA ABC BCB) suggests but departs from the rigorous pattern of Dante's terza rima.

Analysis
Marveled at for its compactness, "Fire and Ice" signaled for Frost "a new style, tone, manner, [and] form." Its casual tone masks the serious question it poses to the reader.

Compression of Dante's Inferno
In a 1999 article, John N. Serio claims that the poem is a compression of Dante's Inferno. He draws a parallel between the nine lines of the poem with the nine rings of Hell, and notes that, like the downward funnel of the rings of Hell, the poem narrows considerably in the last two lines. Additionally, the rhyme scheme—ABA ABC BCB—he remarks, is similar to the one Dante invented for Inferno.

Frost's diction further highlights the parallels between Frost's discussion of desire and hate with Dante's outlook on sins of passion and reason with sensuous and physical verbs describing desire and loosely recalling the characters Dante met in the upper rings of Hell: "taste" (recalling the Glutton), "hold" (recalling the adulterous lovers), and "favor" (recalling the hoarders). In contrast, hate is discussed with verbs of reason and thought ("I think I know.../To say...").

Musical adaptations 
 "Fire and Ice" by the American composer Andrea Clearfield, a choral cantata using the poem's lyrics as libretto.
"Fire and Ice" by the American composer Fred Lerdahl, a vocal arrangement of the poem.
 "Fire and Ice" by the American composer Kirke Mechem, one of the choral settings in his opus "American Trio."

In popular culture

 The fantasy writer George R. R. Martin has said that the title of his A Song of Ice and Fire series, which was later adapted into the Game of Thrones television series, was partly inspired by the poem.
 The poem is the epigraph of Stephenie Meyers' book, Eclipse, of the Twilight Saga. It is also read by Kristen Stewart's character, Bella Swan, at the beginning of the film Eclipse.

References

External links

 A few reviews/commentaries

1920 poems
Apocalyptic literature
Poetry by Robert Frost
Works originally published in Harper's Magazine
American poems
Modernist poems